Patricia Helen LaMarche (born November 26, 1960) is an American political figure and activist with the Green Party of the United States; she was the party's vice-presidential candidate in the 2004 United States presidential election, with David Cobb as its presidential candidate, and was one of seven co-chairs of the party’s national committee, and was elected to that position on July 24, 2005.

LaMarche is also a two-time former candidate for Governor of Maine (1998 and 2006).

Early life
LaMarche was born in Providence, Rhode Island, the fourth of five children. She grew up in a public housing project in that city. Her maternal grandparents were immigrants from southern Ireland. Her father, Paul Henri LaMarche, is a doctor, and her mother, Genevieve (née Judge), was at that time a housewife but later became an auditor employed by the state of Maine. When the family moved to Bangor, Maine, in the 1970s, LaMarche enrolled at John Bapst Memorial High School where she graduated near the top of her class. She pursued her education with four years at Boston College.

LaMarche returned to Maine in 1982, and the following year, she married Michael Russell. She had two children: Rebecca in 1985 and John in 1987. Patricia and Michael divorced in 1990. In the late 1980s, she moved into the broadcasting field and was employed at various television and radio stations in the Bangor area. LaMarche has taught Public Relations at Husson College's school of Communications and headed the Bangor chapter of the Children's Miracle Network.

In 1996 LaMarche moved south to Portland, Maine, to take a job at talk radio station WGAN.

Public life
Until the beginning of her vice-presidential campaign, LaMarche was employed by a country music radio station in Maine under the pseudonym of Genny Judge; however, this ended with her candidacy.

On September 5, 2004, LaMarche announced that she would be visiting and staying overnight in homeless and domestic violence shelters throughout the United States "to draw attention to those living on the edge of society."  The campaign dubbed this LaMarche's "Left-Out Tour." Left Out in America, LaMarche's book which chronicles her tour through American homeless shelters, was released on October 5, 2006, by Upsala Press.

1998 gubernatorial election
In 1998, LaMarche was approached to run for governor by Green Party activists on the Maine Green Independent Party nominee. Despite only raising $20,000, LaMarche's campaign won 7% of the vote. Because her campaign received more than 5% of the total vote, she became the first woman in the history of the state of Maine to gain ballot access for a political party.

2006 gubernatorial election
On December 8, 2005, LaMarche announced her candidacy on the Maine Green Independent Party ticket for the 2006 Maine gubernatorial election against incumbent Democrat John Baldacci. Her positions garnered the endorsement, among others, of Chris Miller, progressive former Democratic candidate for governor who lost in the primaries. LaMarche was one of three Maine Candidates who took advantage of Maine's Clean Election Act, a taxpayer-funded campaign system which rewards candidates with public funds if they meet the required 2,500 $5 contributions In November 2006, LaMarche received 51,992 votes (9.56%) in the Maine race for governor.

The LaMarche for Governor website was being permanently archived by the Library of Congress official 2006 Election archive. The site also won a number of awards, including The Golden Dot Award as Best Local Campaign Website of the 2006 campaign at the annual Politics Online conference held in Washington, D.C., on March 15, 2007, A Pollie Award from the American Association of Political Consultants (AAPC) in the gubernatorial websites category, and An Honorable Mention from AAPC for mobile technology used in the LaMarche campaign.

Homeless Advocacy and Activism

#MemorialBlanket 
In 2021, LaMarche spoke at the graduation ceremony for economically disadvantaged individuals who had to take a money management class to improve their housing and living assistance. After reminding the organizers that no one can stretch a penny far enough to compensate for having too few pennies to begin with - LaMarche congratulated the graduates and spent time getting to know them better. One woman on permanent disability explained that her dream existence would include crocheting every day. Walking home that night, LaMarche realized that she could create an art installation that would allow her to do just that... AND remind her community that homelessness kills. Indeed - every year, on homeless memorial night, advocates across the country commemorate those who are lost on the street. December 21st - the longest day of the year - is that day. LaMarche's efforts were supported by Matthew Best, Max Donnelly and Marsha Roscoe. With the help of hundreds of artisans and volunteers, together they put 219 handmade blankets out, overnight, to mark the solemn event. 

In 2022, the blanket project returned. This time LaMarche arranged the event to grace the West Lawn of the US Capitol. With a generous grant from the Evangelical Lutheran Church of America and in cooperation with thousands of volunteers, the #memorialblanket art installation took place in front of the most powerful building on the planet.

Other occupations 
From 2007 until 2011, LaMarche authored a weekly syndicated column which can be read on line in the Bangor Daily News. LaMarche was also a Contributing Author for the online news and commentary site New Clear Vision as well as a contributor to the Huffington Post.

Along with her journalism, LaMarche was Vice President of Safe Harbour, a homeless shelter based in Carlisle, Pennsylvania for several years.  She returned to Maine in June 2011, having been offered the opportunity by Stephen King to institute "a left-leaning" talk show.  With her co-presenter, Don Cookson, LaMarche appeared on the WZON show The Pulse five mornings each week.  In November 2011, in order to raise matched funding on offer from Stephen King to provide winter heat for Mainers without, LaMarche announced her intention to spend a week living in a "Hobbit Hole" outdoors, notwithstanding the bracing Maine fall conditions. She repeated the feat in 2012, garnering thousands of dollars in contributions.  Her last broadcast on the morning show was November 16, 2012.

Upon returning to Pennsylvania she worked with Rick Smith on the Rick Smith Show from Harrisburg. LaMarche and Smith traveled 9800 miles of the U.S., broadcasting nightly and she came away with her second book, Daddy, What's the Middle Class? She is working to help end poverty in Appalachia.

LaMarche and fellow homeless advocate, Diane Nilan, traveled regularly speaking for agencies and universities about ever-growing despair among America's poorest residents. They refer to themselves as the Babes of Wrath as a tribute to the important lessons delivered by John Steinbeck in his epic novel, The Grapes of Wrath.

In June 2019, LaMarche published a novel, Magic Diary through Sunbury Press.

Pat's newest novel, Priscilla the Princess of the Park, is part one of a four-part series dealing with homelessness through the eyes of an elderly woman and the young people she befriends in the park. It is published by the non-profit, Charles Bruce Foundation, with all proceeds helping others.

January 2023 - Stringer for the Bucks County Beacon 
LaMarche begins covering the Harrisburg beat for Philadelphia area local paper. Her first article runs January 25.

Footnotes

External links
Official Pat LaMarche for Governor Website
LaMarche's column for Bangor Daily News
LaMarche as contributor to the Huffington Post
 Profile page The Authors Guild

 (alt)

1960 births
21st-century American politicians
American anti–nuclear power activists
American democracy activists
American environmentalists
American women environmentalists
American people of Irish descent
Consumer rights activists
Female candidates for Vice President of the United States
Green Party of the United States chairs
Green Party of the United States vice presidential nominees
Husson University faculty
Living people
Maine Greens
Politicians from Bangor, Maine
Politicians from Providence, Rhode Island
2004 United States vice-presidential candidates
Women in Maine politics
21st-century American women politicians
Radio personalities from Maine
Activists from Maine
American women academics